Lucy Helyn Deakins (born December 18, 1971) is an American attorney and former actress best known for starring as Milly in The Boy Who Could Fly and originating the role of Lily Walsh on As the World Turns.

Biography
Deakins was born in New York City, the daughter of Alice, a professor at Columbia University, and Roger, a professor at New York University. She graduated from Stuyvesant High School and enrolled in Harvard University in 1988. She graduated in 1994 with a degree in comparative religion. She took time off from acting to backpack across Europe.

In 2007, she graduated from University of Washington School of Law and is now a practicing attorney in Denver, Colorado, specializing in the energy industry. She is a partner in the Denver law firm, Dunsing, Deakins & Galera.

Filmography

Film

Television

Awards and nominations

References

External links
 
 

1971 births
Living people
20th-century American actresses
21st-century American actresses
Actresses from New York City
American child actresses
American film actresses
American television actresses
Harvard College alumni
People from New York City
Stuyvesant High School alumni